WYMT-TV (channel 57) is a television station licensed to Hazard, Kentucky, United States, serving as the CBS affiliate for the Eastern Kentucky Coalfield region. Owned by Gray Television, the station maintains studios on Black Gold Boulevard off the KY 15 bypass in Hazard, and its transmitter is located south of the city in the Perry County community of Viper.

Although identifying as a separate station in its own right, WYMT is actually considered a semi-satellite of WKYT-TV (channel 27) in Lexington. As such, it clears all network programming as provided through its parent station but airs a separate offering of syndicated programming; there are also separate local newscasts, commercial inserts and legal station identifications. Master control and some internal operations are based at WKYT's facilities on Winchester Road in Lexington.

History

As an NBC affiliate 
The station began broadcasting on analog UHF channel 57 as WKYH-TV (meaning "Kentucky, Hazard") on October 20, 1969. It initially operated as an independent station until acquiring an NBC affiliation in 1970. With the station’s founding, Hazard became one of the smallest towns in the nation with its own television station as the town had a population of 5,000 at that time. Initially, WKYH maintained studios in downtown Hazard, and transmitted its signal from from a tower located at the headquarters of the local cable system.
Prior to its inception, some counties in southeastern Kentucky were among the last remaining parts of the country unable to clearly receive a commercial television signal over the air. Kentucky Educational Television had set up locally-based WKHA (channel 35) the year before; as such, it represented a highly unusual instance where public television was made available to an audience before that of a commercial broadcaster. Although this area is considered part of the Lexington market, none of that city's television signals covered the area at the time. Lexington was an all-UHF market, and UHF stations don't get good reception in rugged terrain even in the best conditions. This part of Appalachia has long been one of the poorest in the nation, and many people still couldn't afford to buy a television set. Such conditions made the Lexington stations unwilling to set up even low-powered translators in this area. Instead, WKYH was founded by local businessman Bill Gorman, who, in addition to building and owning the Hazard-area cable television company since 1965, also operated a closed-circuit local access channel for the system. Gorman would also serve as mayor of Hazard from 1978 until his death in October 2010. Martin Ogrosky served as News Director and in other positions along with William "Bill" Helton, William "Bill" Gorman, Jr., and others.

In keeping with the region's strong musical traditions, country, bluegrass, and Southern Gospel music constituted a good part of WKYH's early local programs. These shows lasted well into the 1980s (in the case of the Goins Brothers, as late as 1994) after country-music programs had fallen out of favor even on other Southern stations. Religious programming from local ministers and churches was shown almost daily in the early years as well, not just on Sundays as was the norm elsewhere then.

Throughout its entire run as WKYH, the station's on-air look was very primitive, even by small-market standards. Much of its equipment had been bought as surplus from other stations and was usually in a poor state of repair after as much as two decades of use. This was especially true of the transmitter; in June 1980, the station was forced off the air for more than two weeks, because the transmitter lost its klystron tubes. The tubes finally being replaced by July 1980 after engineers purchased and hauled a set of replacement klystron tubes from General Electric's headquarters in Schenectady, New York in order for the station to return to the air. It was only through this event that the station management learned how many people relied on WKYH as it was considered to be too small a station to be its own market by Arbitron or Nielsen, or have its own programming listings published in TV Guide. In spite of the transmitter repair of 1980, by the following year, the station's signal still had deteriorated to the point of unacceptability and barely reached areas outside of Hazard's city limits. Video clips of the station's newscasts and commercials from the early 1980s, as well as a nightly sign-off clip from its final weeks as an NBC affiliate provided evidence of the shaky signal quality. WKYH did not even have a character generator for its newscasts. NBC refused to provide a network feed, believing that it was not worth the trouble and cost to provide one in such a small market. Station engineers were forced to rely on microwave links from WLEX-TV in Lexington and WCYB-TV in Bristol, Virginia (from the Tri-Cities market) for network programming. WCYB was used as a backup in case WLEX preempted an NBC show to show local programming. Whenever the microwave system failed, WKYH was forced to switch to and from WLEX or WCYB's signal, usually with less-than-satisfactory results. When this happened, WKYH sometimes aired WLEX or WCYB's commercials or station IDs when it was unable to cover them up in time. As such, the station never thrived, even when cable TV arrived in the area. This situation allowed WKYH to relate to NBC during the period when that network was presided over by Fred Silverman.

New ownership to present
In June 1985, Gorman sold the station to Bluegrass Broadcasting, a unit of Kentucky Central Insurance Company, then owner of WKYT, for an estimated $1 million. After approval of the sale, the new owner changed the calls on the morning of Saturday, October 19 of that year to the current WYMT, meaning "We're Your Mountain Television". The old WKYH callsign now exists on a Paintsville-licensed AM radio station in nearby Johnson County which, incidentally, launched in 1985 as WKLW. WYMT's then-new owner also changed the station's affiliation to CBS to match that of WKYT. With wealthier ownership, WYMT was able to build a much more modern studio and a stronger transmitter. The station also got a significant on-air facelift, making it look even more modern. When Kentucky Central went bankrupt in 1993, WYMT and WKYT were bought by Gray Communications (now Gray Television, the current owner). In 2004, WYMT’s digital television companion was assigned VHF channel 12 as its final transmission frequency. One benefit to viewers in the area is that VHF signals "bend" over mountainous terrain better than UHF. This not only greatly improved WYMT's signal, but made reception available over a larger area than was previously available, even after the FCC-mandated digital transition of 2009. For several years after, non-HD programming aired stretched out until technical upgrades allowed those programs to air in HD. As of February 17, 2009, WYMT broadcasts exclusively in digital.

WYMT remains the only full-power commercial station in Hazard; cable or satellite is necessary to receive any other major commercial network affiliates. WYMT is not carried on satellite television because Hazard is part of the Lexington market; accordingly, WKYT must be provided to the area, and satellite providers have a right not to carry a duplicate network affiliate in the same market due to bandwidth limitations. Gray Television applied to the FCC to carve out a unique satellite carriage area for WYMT alone, including the easternmost portion of the Lexington market and Kentucky counties assigned to the Tri-Cities, Knoxville, and Charleston–Huntington markets. DirecTV and Dish Network argued it would be technically and economically infeasible, as they would be required to create a new spot beam for this particular area, and cited their right to refuse carriage. The FCC agreed with the satellite companies, and ruled against Gray on May 16, 2018.

WYMT-DT2

In 2009, WYMT-DT2 was launched as a standard-definition simulcast of WKYT. The simulcast ended on August 1, 2014, when that simulcast was replaced by the This TV network that provides classic movies and a few classic TV shows. Some additional syndicated programming is also broadcast on the DT2 subchannel. In early 2017, This TV was replaced with the Weigel Broadcasting-operated Heroes & Icons network.

Programming

Sports programming
WYMT and WKYT regularly broadcast Kentucky Wildcats content, due partly to WKYT's status as the television flagship of the UK Sports Network (historically the Big Blue Sports Network), and also due to the Southeastern Conference's broadcast contracts with CBS Sports. In addition to CBS Sports content, both WYMT and WKYT also broadcast the syndicated package of SEC college football and men's basketball games from Raycom Sports (formerly Jefferson-Pilot and Lincoln Financial Sports) from the 1980s until 2009, when Raycom lost the SEC syndication rights. In 2009, the station began carrying the ESPN Plus-operated syndication service SEC TV (formerly SEC Network), which ceased operations in 2014 because of the launch of the new SEC Network, which is the cable- and satellite-only channel operated by ESPN.

From 2014 to 2019, WYMT-DT2 served as the local home of Raycom's ACC Network, the syndicated package of Atlantic Coast Conference football and basketball. This ended with the launch of ESPN's pay TV-only ACC Network in August 2019.

Locally produced programs
 Appalachian Wireless Sports Overtime
 Issues & Answers: The Mountain Edition
 Sports Overtime Saturday Night

Newscasts
In the 1970s and 1980s as WKYH, the newscasts were known as 57 NewsService.

The first newscast as WYMT was broadcast on the evening of October 21, 1985. Currently during the week, WYMT produces separate morning, 4, 5:30, 6, and 11 o'clock newscasts on weekdays. It simulcasts WKYT's weekday noon and 5 p.m. broadcasts. On the weekends, WYMT produces separate 6 and 11 p.m. newscasts, while simulcasting WKYT's weekend morning newscasts. Although WKYT has been airing newscasts in high definition since April 11, 2007, WYMT simulcast them in standard definition until a master control upgrade in 2022. In addition to its main studios, WYMT operates one news bureau in downtown Pikeville.

WYMT also acts as WKYT's news bureau in the Eastern Kentucky Coalfields region; a number of WKYT reporters appear on WYMT. Indeed, WYMT is the only commercial station with any presence at all in this part of the market.

In WYMT weather segments, it uses regional National Weather Service radar data presented on-screen in a system called "Live Pinpoint Doppler". WKYT at one time operated its own weather radar called "Live First Alert Defender". Sports Overtime is WYMT's weekly sports show that airs on Friday nights from August to April which covers high school athletics. A Saturday edition focusing on college sports aired from 2006 to 2008, and returned in 2013 with the return of weekend news. On April 15, 2014, the station began broadcasting its newscasts in HD, using robotic HD cameras, and introducing new graphics and music.

Notable former on-air staff
Jay Crawford (creator of Sports Overtime on WYMT) – went on to become host of ESPN2's Cold Pizza (later changed to First Take). Later anchor of ESPN's SportsCenter, laid off from ESPN in April 2017.

Technical information

Subchannels
The station's digital signal is multiplexed:

Analog-to-digital conversion
WYMT-TV shut down its analog signal, over UHF channel 57, on February 17, 2009, the original target date in which full-power television stations in the United States were to transition from analog to digital broadcasts under federal mandate (which was later pushed back to June 12, 2009). The station's digital signal remained on its pre-transition VHF channel 12. Through the use of PSIP, digital television receivers display the station's virtual channel as its former UHF analog channel 57, which was among the high band UHF channels (52-69) that were removed from broadcasting use as a result of the transition. WYMT has a pending application to move its digital signal to channel 20.

WYMT coverage area
WYMT serves 20 counties in the eastern part of Kentucky.  It also serves several counties in southwest Virginia and western West Virginia, and appears on cable television in Claiborne County, Tennessee. It primarily serves the eight easternmost counties of the Lexington market (including Perry County, home to Hazard itself). However, its claimed coverage area includes portions of three additional DMAs. The easternmost counties (Pike, Floyd, Martin, Johnson, and Lawrence) are in the Huntington–Charleston, West Virginia market (home territory for sister station and NBC affiliate WSAZ-TV). Letcher and Leslie counties in Kentucky, Wise County including the independent city of Norton, Dickenson County including Clintwood in Virginia are in the Tri-Cities DMA. WYMT also claims to serve Bell, Harlan, and McCreary counties, which are part of the Knoxville market (home territory for sister station and fellow CBS affiliate WVLT-TV).

References

External links
 Official website

CBS network affiliates
Heroes & Icons affiliates
Circle (TV network) affiliates
Gray Television
Television channels and stations established in 1969
Television stations in Kentucky
Hazard, Kentucky